Gayer or Gáyer may refer to:
Catherine Gayer, American coloratura soprano
Gyula Gáyer, Hungarian botanist
John Gayer (disambiguation), various people
Karin Gayer (born 1969), Austrian writer 
Ted Gayer, American economist

See also
 Geier (disambiguation)
 Geijer
 Geyer (disambiguation)